Perfect Strangers is a 2017 Spanish comedy thriller film directed by Álex de la Iglesia remaking the 2016 Italian film of the same name. It stars Belén Rueda, Eduard Fernández, Ernesto Alterio, Juana Acosta, Eduardo Noriega, Dafne Fernández and Pepón Nieto.The film grossed €18.9 million at the box office by February 2018.

Premise
Seven friends decide to play a game at their dinner party, in which each member needs to read aloud all incoming text messages or put phone calls on speaker for all to hear. This causes many revelations to materialize, and challenges the "normal" of everyone at the dinner.

Cast

Production 
The film is a Telecinco Cinema, Pokeepsie Films and Nadie Es Perfecto production, with the participation of Mediaset España and Movistar+.

Release 
Distributed by Universal Pictures, the film was theatrically released in Spain on 1 December 2017.

Box office
The film was the second highest-grossing Spanish language film of 2018 in Spain, with a box-office taking of €13 million from 2 million admissions. The film also stayed as one of the highest-grossing Spanish language films of 2018 in Spain, and finished third grossing €9.2 million from 1.3 million admissions. Worldwide it had grossed $31 million as of January 2019.

See also
 List of Spanish films of 2017
 List of films featuring eclipses

References

External links
 
 
 

2017 films
2017 comedy films
2017 thriller films
2010s comedy thriller films
Films directed by Álex de la Iglesia
Films produced by Álvaro Augustin
Films produced by Ghislain Barrois
Films with screenplays by Jorge Guerricaechevarría
Mediaset España Comunicación
Movistar+
Spanish comedy thriller films
Spanish remakes of Italian films
Telecinco Cinema films
Universal Pictures films
2010s Spanish-language films
2010s Spanish films